India Lee is a British professional triathlete competing at both short course (ITU) and long course (Ironman 70.3) distances.

Career

Short Course Triathlon 
Lee's highest placing in short course triathlon was in 2016 when she became the European Triathlon Union (ETU) European Champion, duplicating this success with team GB in the mixed relay.

In the ITU Triathlon World Cup, she won the race at Cagliari in 2016.

Long Course Triathlon 

In her debut at the 70.3 distance, Lee won the 2018 Weymouth 70.3 Ironman, repeating the feat at the same race in 2019.

Later in 2019 she took the win at the second edition of the Lahti 70.3 Ironman, with compatriot Katrina Matthews in Silver, and had success at IRONMAN 70.3 Pays d’Aix with Bronze in 2019, rounding out the podium behind race winner Emma Pallant and Silver medallist Nikki Bartlett.

Lee competed in her first Ironman 70.3 World Championships at Nice in 2019 coming 11th, and followed this by recording a 6th place at the Ironman 70.3 Middle East championships.

As a result of her placing in the latter race she secured a place at the Ironman 70.3 World Championships 2020, but due to the events of Covid-19 the 2020 Ironman and 70.3 Ironman World Championships were cancelled with dates for 2021 announced. It appears that athletes who qualified for these championships will be permitted to race at the 2021 editions.

Lee currently has her training base in Bath, and is coached by Rhys Davey (coach of fellow Team GB triathlete Vicky Holland).

References 

English female triathletes
British female triathletes
1988 births
1998 births
Living people